Michaelson is an English patronymic surname meaning "son of Michael". There are varied English and Scandinavian spellings. It is rare as a given name. Notable people with the surname include:

 Ben Michaelson (born 1981), American swimmer
 Ingrid Michaelson (born 1979), American singer/songwriter
 Isaac Michaelson (1903–1982), Scottish-born Israeli ophthalmologist
 M. Alfred Michaelson (1878–1949), American politician
 Ron Michaelson, American actor
 Scott Michaelson (born 1968), Australian actor

Fictional characters
Jack Michaelson, fictional character in the British soap opera, Brookside, played by actor Paul Duckworth
 Louis Michaelson, a character played by Fred Savage in the 1986 American fantasy drama film The Boy Who Could Fly

See also
 Michelson (disambiguation)
 Mickelson
 Michaelsen
 Michelsen

References

English-language surnames
Patronymic surnames
Surnames from given names